Kate Bevilaqua (born 4 August 1977) is an Australian triathlete and the winner of the women's 2010 Ironman Western Australia Triathlon.

References

External links 
 Kate Bevilaqua's website

Australian female triathletes
Living people
1977 births